Pennsylvania Route 343  (PA 343) is an  route running from Lebanon north to Fredericksburg in Lebanon County, Pennsylvania. It begins at PA 72 and ends at Exit 6 of Interstate 78 (I-78). PA 343 heads mostly through urbanized areas near Lebanon before continuing into rural areas further north. There is a concurrency with U.S. Route 22 (US 22) near the northern terminus.

PA 343 has had a number of different realignments, most of them relating to the northern terminus of the highway. The highway originally terminated at an intersection with PA 443 in Lickdale, moved to end in the community of Bordnersville soon after. The highway was then extended along the local continuation to end at US 22 in Harper Tavern. In 1963, PA 343 was moved back to Lickdale, and seven years after, moved to its northern terminus, thirteen years after the construction of I-78.

Route description 

PA 343 begins at an intersection with PA 72, near the Northwest Elementary School, in the city of Lebanon in Lebanon County. PA 343 heads eastward along Maple Street, a two-lane undivided street maintained by the city, past urbanized homes and businesses. The route turns north onto North 7th Street and passes more development. PA 343 leaves Lebanon for North Lebanon Township, where it becomes state-maintained and passes through the residential community of Reindeldville. The road runs north-northeast past more homes and businesses as it heads through the community of Eustontown. The route leaves the urbanized areas and heads into agricultural areas with some trees and homes. PA 343 turns northwest at the Heffelfinger Road intersection and enters Bethel Township, where it heads north as South Pine Grove Street through a patch of woods before running through more farmland. The road runs to the west of Little Swatara Creek  and passes to the east of Pine Meadows Golf Course before it crosses the creek. The route continues through rural areas and passes through the residential community of Shirksville. PA 343 heads north through more farmland before it comes to an intersection with US 22 (William Penn Highway) south of the community of Fredericksburg.

At this point, South Pine Grove Street continues to Fredericksburg and PA 343 turns northeast to become concurrent with US 22 on four-lane divided William Penn Highway. The road runs through agricultural areas with some commercial development, passing to the south of a warehouse. PA 343 splits from US 22 by heading north on two-lane undivided Pine Grove Road, passing to the west of a park. The route continues near rural commercial development before it reaches its northern terminus at a partial interchange with I-78, with access to westbound I-78 and access from eastbound I-78. Past this interchange, Pine Grove Road continues north as SR 1007 toward the Berks County line.

History 
PA 343 was assigned in the numbering of state routes in Pennsylvania during 1928. The highway then ran from the southern terminus in Lebanon, which was at the time, an intersection with US 22 (now US 422). At Fredericksburg, the route reached an intersection with PA 43 (now US 22). At Fredericksburg, highway turned to the northwest and headed to Lickdale. There it terminated at an intersection with PA 443. The highway stayed intact for two years, until 1930, when the highway was extended a few miles to the community of Bordnersville, where the road then continued as a local highway.

The highway was paved from Fredericksburg to an intersection with Lancaster Street and from Lickdale to Bordnersville in 1932. In 1936, the Pennsylvania Department of Highways extended PA 343 past Bordnersville and Lickdale, along the local road. This changed the northern terminus to an intersection with US 22 (formerly the alignment of PA 43) in Harper Tavern. This alignment remained intact for more than two decades. In 1963, even with the construction of I-78 six years prior, PA 343 was realigned once again by the Department of Highways. This time, the northern terminus was cut back to the PA 72 intersection in Lickdale, with an extended PA 934 replacing the route between Harper Tavern and Lickdale. This change was made to provide the same route number on both sides of the I-81 interchange north of Harper Tavern. The highway remained intact for another seven years, and in 1970, PA 343 was realigned for the final time, this time onto its current alignment. The northern terminus is now at a partial interchange with I-78.

Major intersections

See also

References

External links

Pennsylvania Highways: PA 343

343
Transportation in Lebanon County, Pennsylvania